Last drop is often an allusion to the proverb "The last drop makes the cup run over". It may also refer to:

 The Last Drop (Leyster), a 1639 painting by Judith Leyster
 The Last Drop of Water, a 1911 American film by D.W. Griffth
 "Last Drop", a  2004 song by Kevin Lyttle
 The Last Drop, a 2006 British-Romanian WWII film by Colin Teague
 Every Last Drop, a 2008 horror novel by Charlie Huston in the Joe Pitt series

See also
 Seneca's phrase "It is not the last drop that empties the water-clock, but all that which previously has flowed out"
 Final straw (disambiguation)